Katherine Grey (born Katherine Best; 1873–1950) was a Broadway actress in New York City.

Born Katherine Best in San Francisco, California, Grey joined the Augustin Daly company  over the objections of her family. Her first New York appearance was in The Golden Widow. Grey's work outside the United States included two years in Australia. By April 1914, Grey had been the leading lady for more male stars than any other actress then living.

On August 10, 1891, Grey married actor Paul Arthur in New York. After his death, she married actor John B. Mason. She died on March 21, 1950, in Orleans, Massachusetts.

References

External links

Katherine Grey: Broadway Photographs (Univ. of South Carolina)

19th-century American actresses
American stage actresses
20th-century American actresses
1873 births
1950 deaths
Actresses from San Francisco